Manuel Castellano Castro (born 27 March 1989), commonly known as Lillo, is a Spanish footballer who plays for CD Alcoyano as a right or left-back.

Club career
Born in Aspe, Alicante, Valencian Community, Lillo began his career with local Valencia CF, playing three seasons with the reserves. In 2006–07 and 2009–10, he totalled 23 appearances, with the team being relegated from Segunda División B on both occasions. In between, he spent the 2008–09 campaign on loan at Real Murcia, playing less than one third of the games as the club finished 14th in the Segunda División.

On 21 March 2010, Lillo appeared in his first official match with the main squad, playing the first 45 minutes of a 2–0 La Liga home win against UD Almería. In late May, as his contract with the Che was expiring, he signed with Elche CF; however, due to a mistake from his agent, the move was declared void and, two months later, he joined Almería.

Lillo spent the vast majority of his first season with the Andalusians with the B side in division three, appearing in only two games with the first team. In November 2012, the free agent joined another club in that tier, CD Alcoyano.

On 18 July 2013, Lillo moved to SD Eibar, recently promoted to the second division. He played 26 matches in his debut campaign, with the Armeros being promoted to the top flight for the first time ever, and on 11 July 2014 renewed his link for a further year.

Lillo agreed to an extension at the Basque club on 31 December 2014, until 2017. On 5 July 2016, he mutually agreed to terminate his contract, and signed a two-year deal with Sporting de Gijón just hours later.

On 1 September 2017, free agent Lillo agreed to a two-year contract with CA Osasuna in the second division.

Career statistics

Club

Honours
Eibar
Segunda División: 2013–14

Osasuna
Segunda División: 2018–19

Spain U20
Mediterranean Games: 2009

References

External links

CiberChe biography and stats 

1989 births
Living people
People from Vinalopó Mitjà
Sportspeople from the Province of Alicante
Spanish footballers
Footballers from the Valencian Community
Association football defenders
La Liga players
Segunda División players
Segunda División B players
Tercera División players
Primera Federación players
Valencia CF Mestalla footballers
Valencia CF players
Real Murcia players
UD Almería B players
UD Almería players
CD Alcoyano footballers
SD Eibar footballers
Sporting de Gijón players
CA Osasuna players
CD Numancia players
Israeli Premier League players
Maccabi Haifa F.C. players
Spain youth international footballers
Competitors at the 2009 Mediterranean Games
Mediterranean Games medalists in football
Mediterranean Games gold medalists for Spain
Spanish expatriate footballers
Expatriate footballers in Israel
Spanish expatriate sportspeople in Israel